Arvid Schenk (born 28 July 1989) is a German former professional football player who played as a goalkeeper. He is currently the goalkeeping coach for Hamburger SV II.

Career
Schenk was signed by Dundee in October 2014, to provide goalkeeping cover after Kyle Letheren was injured. He made his first and only appearance for Dundee in a Dundee derby on 1 January 2015, but experienced a "nightmare debut" as Dundee lost 6–2 to Dundee United. It was the first time that Dundee had conceded six goals in a Dundee derby match. He was released by Dundee on 28 January 2015. After a couple of years back in the regional leagues of Germany, Schenk retired from football in 2017.

Since 2017, Schenk has been a youth goalkeeping coach for Hamburger SV, and for the majority of that time has been the goalkeeping coach for Hamburger SV II.

References

External links
 
 

Living people
1989 births
Sportspeople from Rostock
German footballers
Association football goalkeepers
Footballers from Mecklenburg-Western Pomerania
FC Hansa Rostock players
FC St. Pauli players
VfL Wolfsburg II players
Dundee F.C. players
Altonaer FC von 1893 players
SV Eichede players
2. Bundesliga players
Scottish Professional Football League players
German expatriate footballers
German expatriate sportspeople in Scotland
Expatriate footballers in Scotland